The Kapella River is a river in the Kitimat Ranges of the Coast Mountains in British Columbia, Canada.  It rises west of Cornice Peak and flows northwest to join the Kitlope River.

See also
Capella (disambiguation)
List of rivers of British Columbia

References

Rivers of the Kitimat Ranges
Rivers of the North Coast of British Columbia